Termitomyces le-testui is a species of agaric fungus in the family Lyophyllaceae. It was first described scientifically from Africa by French mycologist Narcisse Théophile Patouillard in 1916, and transferred to the genus Termitomyces by Roger Heim in 1942. The mushroom is edible and used as food.

References

Lyophyllaceae
Fungi described in 1916
Fungi of Africa
Taxa named by Narcisse Théophile Patouillard